Afro-Omanis are Omani people of African Zanj heritage. Most are usually living in the coastal cities of Oman, with many speaking Arabic and adhering to Islam. Their origins date back to the time of the Arab slave trade and era Slavery in Oman, and when Zanzibar was a part of the Omani Empire.

Heritage
Some Afro-Omanis are still able to maintain rituals related to healing that are of Zanj origin. The languages used in these rituals are Swahili and Arabic.

Notable People
 Ali Al-Habsi

See also
 Slavery in Oman

References

African diaspora in the Arab world
Ethnic groups in Oman
 
African diaspora in the Middle East